VOX Schallplatten- und Sprechmaschinen-Aktiengesellschaft, Berlin was a German record label founded in 1921. One source suggests that it issued the first electrical recordings in Germany in late 1924 or early 1925, presumably recorded by a method other than that of Western Electric, but notes that it did not generally adopt electric recording technology until some 18 months later.

Selected sessionography

Gallery

See also
 List of record labels

External links
 Online discography

References

General 

<li> "A Discographical Look at German Vox," by Björn Englund (sv) (born 1942) July 29, 2003

Inline 

German record labels
Record labels established in 1921